The women's individual time trial competition at the 2014 Asian Games was held on 27 September.

Schedule
All times are Korea Standard Time (UTC+09:00)

Results

References 
Results

External links 
 

Road Women ITT